The 2010 Cash Converters World Cup of Darts was the first edition of the PDC World Cup of Darts which took place between 3–5 December 2010 at the Rainton Meadows Arena in Houghton-le-Spring, England.

The tournament was won by Raymond van Barneveld and Co Stompé for the Netherlands, who defeated Mark Webster and Barrie Bates of Wales in the final.

Format 
The participating teams were the top 24 countries in the PDC Order of Merit at the end of October after the 2010 World Grand Prix. Each nations top ranked player was then joined by the second highest player of that country. For seeding the average rank of both was used.

The top 8 nations automatically started in the second round (last 16). The other 16 nations played in the first round. Matches were best of 11 legs in doubles, and the losing team threw first in the next leg. The winners of the first round played the top eight ranked teams in the second round, also in best of 11 doubles.

The winners of the second round were placed into two groups of four (A & B). The teams in Group A would be seeds 2, 3, 6 & 7 (or whoever beat those seeds in the second round), and the teams in Group B would be seeds 1, 4, 5 & 8 (or whoever beat those seeds in the second round). Each team played each other once (three matches per team). Each match consisted of two singles and one doubles - all over best of five legs. 1 point was awarded for a singles win, and 2 points for a doubles win, with all points counting towards the overall league table. The top two teams in each group advanced to the semi-finals.

The semi-finals consisted of four singles games and one doubles game (if required) per match - all over best of 11 legs. Again, 1 point was awarded for a singles win, and 2 points for a doubles win. If the match score was 3–3 at the end of the games, then a sudden-death doubles leg would decide who goes through to the final.

The final was the same format as the semi-final, but each game was best of 15 legs.

Prize money

Teams and seeding

Results

First and second rounds 
The matches were best of 11 legs in the doubles format.

Germany had a bye to the second round, as the Czech Republic were unable to travel due to the inclement weather.

Group stage 
Singles matches were worth one point, doubles matches were worth two points. The top two teams in each group advanced to the semi-finals.

NB: P = Played; W = Won; L = Lost; LF = Legs for; LA = Legs against; +/- = Plus/minus record, in relation to legs; Average = 3-dart average; Pts = Points

 Group A – 4 December (afternoon) 

 Group B – 4 December (evening)

Semi-finals and final 

 Semi-finals – Afternoon 

 Webster & Bates won the sudden death doubles leg against the throw to progress to the final.

 Final – Evening

References 

2010
PDC World Cup
PDC World Cup of Darts
Sport in Tyne and Wear